Poiana Cristei is a commune located in Vrancea County, Romania. It is composed of eight villages: Dealu Cucului, Dumbrava, Mahriu, Odobasca, Petreanu, Podu Lacului, Poiana Cristei and Târâtu.

References

Communes in Vrancea County
Localities in Muntenia